Helen F. Rappaport (née Ware; born June 1947), is a British author and former actress. She specialises in the Victorian era and revolutionary Russia.

Early life and education
Rappaport was born Helen Ware in Bromley, grew up near the River Medway in North Kent and attended Chatham Grammar School for Girls.  Her older brother Mike Ware, born 1939, is a photographer, chemist, and writer. She has twin younger brothers, Peter (also a photographer) and Christopher, born in 1953.

She studied Russian at Leeds University where she was involved in the university Theatre Group and launched her acting career.

Career

Acting
After acting with the Leeds University Theatre Group she appeared in several television series including Crown Court, Love Hurts and The Bill. She later claimed to have spent '20 years in the doldrums as an out of work, broke and miserable actress'...

Writing
In the early nineties she became a copy editor for academic publishers Blackwell and OUP and also contributed to historical and biographical reference works published by for example Cassell and Reader's Digest.

She became a full-time writer in 1998, writing three books for US publisher ABC-CLIO including An Encyclopaedia of Women Social Reformers in 2001, with a foreword by Marian Wright Edelman. It won an award in 2002 from the American Library Association as an Outstanding Reference Source and according to the Times Higher Education Supplement, 'A splendid book, informative and wide-ranging'.

Mary Seacole

In 2003 Rappaport discovered and purchased an 1869 portrait of Jamaican nurse Mary Seacole by Albert Charles Challen. The picture now hangs in the National Portrait Gallery.

Mary Seacole features in Rappaport's 2007 book No Place for Ladies: The Untold Story of Women in the Crimean War which was praised by Simon Sebag Montefiore as being 'Poignant and inspirational, well researched yet thoroughly readable' and also received positive reviews in The Times and The Guardian.

The Last Days of the Romanovs
Her 2008 book Ekaterinburg: The Last Days of the Romanovs received many positive reviews in both the UK and US where it became a bestseller.

Lenin
Conspirator: Lenin in Exile published in 2009 gained considerable publicity due to Rappaport's claim that Lenin died from syphilis and not a stroke.

Victorian cosmetics industry
Her 2010 book, Beautiful For Ever describes the growth of the Victorian cosmetics industry and tells the story of Madame Rachel who found both fame and infamy peddling products which claimed almost magical powers of "restoration and preservation".

Death of Prince Albert
Magnificent Obsession was published on 3 November 2011, the 150th anniversary of its subject; the death of Prince Albert.

Birth of photography
Capturing the Light: The Birth of Photography, co-written with Roger Watson, tells the story of Henry Fox Talbot and Louis Daguerre.  Both authors took part in an event during the Edinburgh Book Festival on 14 August 2013.

Caught in the Revolution
Caught in the Revolution: Petrograd, Russia, 1917 – A World on the Edge was published in 2016 in the UK, where it received many positive reviews.

Translating
Rappaport is a fluent Russian speaker and is a translator of Russian plays, notably those of Anton Chekhov, working with Tom Stoppard, David Hare, David Lan and Nicholas Wright.

Bibliography

Non-fiction
Joseph Stalin: A Biographical Companion, 1999 ABC-CLIO
An Encyclopedia of Women Social Reformers, 2001 ABC-CLIO
Queen Victoria: A Biographical Companion, 2003 ABC-CLIO
No Place for Ladies: The Untold Story of Women in the Crimean War, 2007 Aurum Press
Ekaterinburg: The Last Days of the Romanovs, 2008 Hutchinson
Conspirator: Lenin in Exile, 2009 Hutchinson
Beautiful for Ever: Madame Rachel of Bond Street - Cosmetician, Con-Artist and Blackmailer, 2010 Long Barn Books
Magnificent Obsession; Victoria, Albert and the Death that Changed the Monarchy, 2011 Hutchinson
Capturing the Light: The Birth of Photography, 2013
The Romanov Sisters: The Lost Lives of the Daughters of Nicholas and Alexandra, 2014
Caught in the Revolution: Petrograd, Russia, 1917 – A World on the Edge, 2016
The Race to Save the Romanovs: The Truth Behind the Secret Plans to Rescue the Russian Imperial Family, 2018 St. Martin's Press
After the Romanovs: Russian Exiles in Paris from the Belle Époque Through Revolution and War, 2022 St. Martin's Press
In Search of Mary Seacole: The Making of a Cultural Icon, 2022 Simon & Schuster UK

Fiction
Dark Hearts of Chicago (2007, Hutchinson) - co-wrote with William Horwood

Family life
Rappaport has two daughters.

References

External links

 

People from Bromley
Alumni of the University of Leeds
English television actresses
Russian–English translators
English translators
English biographers
English historical novelists
21st-century British novelists
21st-century English women writers
Actresses from Kent
English women novelists
21st-century biographers
21st-century British translators
Living people
1947 births
Women historical novelists
English women non-fiction writers
Women biographers